Peter Schiller (29 June 1957 – 22 May 2020) was a German ice hockey player. He competed in the men's tournament at the 1988 Winter Olympics.

References

External links
 

1957 births
2020 deaths
German ice hockey players
Ice hockey players at the 1988 Winter Olympics
Olympic ice hockey players of West Germany
People from Wunsiedel (district)
Sportspeople from Upper Franconia